INS Rahav is an Israeli Dolphin 2-class submarine. The name is Hebrew for "Rahab." The submarine was built in Kiel, Germany, and delivered to the Israeli port city Haifa 12 January 2016, where entered service the next day.

Name is from the Bible "Was it not you who cut Rahab to pieces,    who pierced that monster through?" (isaiah 51)

References

External links

 Israeli submarine Dolphin
 FAS: Israel: Submarines
 Dolphin class submarines cutaway diagram, Der Spiegel, 5 June 2012

Attack submarines
2013 ships
Ships built in Kiel
Dolphin-class submarines